Towai is a locality in the Northland Region of the North Island of New Zealand. State Highway 1 passes just to the east. Kawakawa is 16 km northwest, and Whakapara is 17 km southeast. The North Auckland Line passes through Towai.

Towai Primary School closed in January 2005, with students moving to Maromaku School.

The local hapū is Ngāti Hau of Ngāpuhi. The local Akerama Marae and Huiarau or Ruapekapeka meeting house is a meeting place for the hapū.

Demographics
Towai is in the same SA1 statistical area as Maromaku.

References

Far North District
Populated places in the Northland Region